Jacobo Arbenz Vilanova (born 13 November 1946) is a politician in Guatemala. He is the son of former progressive Guatemalan President Jacobo Arbenz Guzmán, who was overthrown in a CIA sponsored coup d'état in 1954. Arbenz Vilanova fled the country following the ouster of his father's government and spent almost 50 years in exile – in Mexico, France, Switzerland, Czech Republic, Soviet Union, Uruguay, Cuba and El Salvador, but mostly in  Costa Rica – before deciding to return during the administration of Alfonso Portillo.

After unsuccessfully trying to form his own political party to fight the 2003 presidential election, he was accepted as the candidate of the Christian Democracy party (DCG) after two earlier DCG presidential candidates withdrew. The DCG ticket, comprising Arbenz Vilanova and vice presidential running mate Mario Rolando Castro de León, was placed eighth, with 1.6% of the total vote.

Arbenz Vilanova graduated in business management in El Salvador and, prior to returning from exile and entering politics, had owned and run a coffee plantation, a livestock farm, and a company dedicated to non-traditional exports. He is married with seven children and, in addition to his native Spanish, speaks French, Czech, Russian and English.

References

External links
Interview with Arbenz and Castro during the 2003 election campaign  (Spanish language)

BBC - The First CIA Coup in Latin America - Interview with Arbenz's son

1946 births
Living people
Guatemalan people of Swiss descent
Guatemalan Christian Democracy politicians
Árbenz family